Strange Gods (original title, Los dioses ajenos) is a 1958 Argentine film directed by Román Viñoly Barreto and starring  Enrique Fava and Olga Zubarry. It was entered into the 8th Berlin International Film Festival.

Cast
 Enrique Fava
 Olga Zubarry

References

External links 
 

1958 films
Argentine drama films
1950s Spanish-language films
Films directed by Román Viñoly Barreto
1950s Argentine films